Air Marshal Sanjeev Kapoor, AVSM, VM is an officer in the Indian Air Force. Currently, he is serving as the director general – Inspection and Flight Safety. He took over the office on 1 May 2022, succeeding Air Marshal Gurcharan Singh Bedi.

Early life and education 
Sanjeev Kapoor is an alumnus of  National Defence Academy, Defence Services Staff College, Flying Instructor School and College of Defence Management.
He has an elder daughter who is serving in the air force and a younger son who is in the indian navy.

Career
Sanjeev Kapoor was commissioned in the flying branch of the Indian Air Force in December 1985. He has over 7800 hours of incident free flying on various trainer, transport and strategic aircraft.

He is one of the stalwarts in Aerial Refueling Operations of the Indian Air Force and has flown the Airborne Warning and Control System (AWACS) aircraft. He had commanded the only Air to Air Refueling squadron No.78 Squadron of the Indian Air Force and has commanded a large operational base with strategic assets.

In his career spanning over three decades, he has held important staff appointments such as director (air-to-air refueling) and principal director (operations) at Air Headquarters. He has vast experience in high-altitude and VVIP flying, air-to-air refuelling and combat operations.

He served as the commandant – Air Force Academy from 1 August 2021 to 31 October 2021.

Before taking the charge as Director General – Inspection and Flight Safety, he served as the Commandant –  National Defence Academy till 31 March 2022.

Honours and decorations 
During his career, Sanjeev Kapoor has been awarded the Vayu Sena Medal (VM) and the Ati Vishisht Seva Medal.

References 

Indian Air Force air marshals
Recipients of the Ati Vishisht Seva Medal
Recipients of the Vayu Sena Medal
Living people
Year of birth missing (living people)
Commandants of the Indian Air Force Academy
National Defence Academy (India) alumni
College of Defence Management alumni
Defence Services Staff College alumni